John Dale  (born 22 March 1940) is a Norwegian politician.

He was born in Vaksdal to Ole J. Dale and Anna Sääv. He was elected representative to the Storting for the period 1993–1997 for the Centre Party, from the constituency of Hordaland, and re-elected for the period 1997–2001.

References

1940 births
Living people
People from Vaksdal
Centre Party (Norway) politicians
Members of the Storting